Perimede purpurescens is a moth in the family Cosmopterigidae. It was described by William Trowbridge Merrifield Forbes in 1931. It is found in Puerto Rico and Cuba.

References

Moths described in 1931
Chrysopeleiinae